"Flash" is a song by Italian-French eurodance act B.B.E. It was released in January 1997 as the second single from their debut album, Games (1998). As a representative of the short-lived dream dance sound, the song became a top 20 hit worldwide, most notably reaching number six in Spain and number five in the United Kingdom.

Critical reception
Chris Finan from Music Weeks RM rated the track five out of five, writing, "To be perfectly honest, before I heard this I was expecting a duplicate '7 Days', no-questions-asked-get-ready-to-cringe commercial rip-off. But no, 'Flash' is a cracking hard-edged synth monster that really does kick in. The arrangement is quite simple really - a slightly similar beat ettect to the last release built up by basic repetitive keyboard lines planned between the peaceful breaks, which sums up the Club mix completely. The Extended mix leans towards full-on and is more ferocious at the start, and is probably what the chartbound version will be hased on. A huge pat on the back for coming up with something equally as good."

Track listing
 CD maxi - Europe (1997)'
 "Flash" (Radio Mix) - 3:58
 "Flash" (Club Mix) - 7:51
 "Photo" (Club Mix) - 6:00

Charts

Weekly charts

Year-end charts

References

1997 singles
1997 songs
Trance songs